Mike Murray (born August 29, 1966) is a Canadian retired professional ice hockey player. He played in one NHL game for the Philadelphia Flyers during the 1987–88 NHL season. He is the general manager for the Knoxville Ice Bears of the Southern Professional Hockey League.

Murray was born in Kingston, Ontario.

See also
List of players who played only one game in the NHL

External links

Flyers History Profile

1966 births
Canadian ice hockey centres
Cornwall Aces players
Dayton Bombers players
Guelph Platers players
Hershey Bears players
Ice hockey people from Ontario
Indianapolis Ice players
Kansas City Blades players
Knoxville Cherokees players
Knoxville Ice Bears (ACHL) players
Knoxville Speed players
Living people
London Knights players
New York Islanders draft picks
Philadelphia Flyers players
Saint John Flames players
Sportspeople from Kingston, Ontario